The reserve de parc national des Collines-Ondulées is a protected area north of Quebec, in Canada. The  territory, designated in 2008, is intended to protect a section of the Labrador Trough. The reserve is also a transition zone between boreal and northern species.

See also 
 National Parks of Quebec
 Nunavik

Notes and references 

IUCN Category II
Protected areas of Nord-du-Québec
National parks of Quebec
Nunavik